Cyphomeris is a genus of flowering plants belonging to the family Nyctaginaceae.

Its native range is Southern Central USA to Central Mexico.

Species:

Cyphomeris crassifolia 
Cyphomeris gypsophiloides

References

Nyctaginaceae
Caryophyllaceae genera